In theoretical physics, a super-Poincaré algebra is an extension of the Poincaré algebra to incorporate supersymmetry, a relation between bosons and fermions. They are examples of supersymmetry algebras (without central charges or internal symmetries), and are Lie superalgebras. Thus a super-Poincaré algebra is a Z2-graded vector space with a graded Lie bracket such that the even part is a Lie algebra containing the Poincaré algebra, and the odd part is built from spinors on which there is an anticommutation relation with values in the even part.

Informal sketch
The Poincaré algebra describes the isometries of Minkowski spacetime. Taking their tensor product, one obtains ; such decompositions of tensor products of representations into direct sums is given by the Littlewood–Richardson rule.

Normally, one treats such a decomposition as relating to specific particles: so, for example, the pion, which is a chiral vector particle, is composed of a quark-anti-quark pair. However, one could also identify  with Minkowski spacetime itself. This leads to a natural question: if Minkowski space-time belongs to the adjoint representation, then can Poincaré symmetry be extended to the fundamental representation? Well, it can: this is exactly the super-Poincaré algebra. There is a corresponding experimental question: if we live in the adjoint representation, then where is the fundamental representation hiding? This is the program of supersymmetry, which has not been found experimentally.

History
The super-Poincaré algebra was first proposed in the context of the Haag–Łopuszański–Sohnius theorem, as a means of avoiding the conclusions of the Coleman–Mandula theorem. That is, the Coleman–Mandula theorem is a no-go theorem that states that the Poincaré algebra cannot be extended with additional symmetries that might describe the internal symmetries of the observed physical particle spectrum. However, the Coleman–Mandula theorem  assumed that the algebra extension would be by means of a commutator; this assumption, and thus the theorem, can be avoided by considering the anti-commutator, that is, by employing anti-commuting Grassmann numbers. The proposal was to consider a supersymmetry algebra, defined as the semidirect product of a central extension of the super-Poincaré algebra by a compact Lie algebra of internal symmetries.

Definition
The simplest supersymmetric extension of the Poincaré algebra contains two Weyl spinors with the following anti-commutation relation:

and all other anti-commutation relations between the Qs and Ps vanish. The operators  are known as supercharges. The index  runs over the values  A dot is used over the index  to remind that this index transforms according to the inequivalent conjugate spinor representation; one must never accidentally contract these two types of indexes. The Pauli matrices can be considered to be a direct manifestation of the Littlewood–Richardson rule mentioned before: they indicate how the tensor product  of the two spinors can be re-expressed as a vector. The index  of course ranges over the space-time dimensions 

The Dirac matrices are thus also four-dimensional, and can be expressed as direct sums of the Pauli matrices. The tensor product then gives an algebraic relation to the Minkowski metric  which is expressed as:

and

This then gives the full algebra

which are to be combined with the normal Poincaré algebra. It is a closed algebra, since all Jacobi identities are satisfied and can have since explicit matrix representations. Following this line of reasoning will lead to supergravity.

Extended supersymmetry 

It is possible to add more supercharges. That is, we fix a number which by convention is labelled , and define supercharges
 with 

These can be thought of as many copies of the original supercharges, and hence satisfy

and

but can also satisfy

and 

where  is the central charge.

Super-Poincaré group and superspace 

Just as the Poincaré algebra generates the Poincaré group of isometries of Minkowski space, the super-Poincaré algebra, an example of a Lie super-algebra, generates what is known as a supergroup. This can be used to define superspace with  supercharges: these are the right cosets of the Lorentz group within the  super-Poincaré group.

That is, we can view superspace as the direct sum of Minkowski space with 'spin dimensions' labelled by coordinates . The supercharge  generates translations in the direction labelled by the coordinate  By counting, there are  spin dimensions.

Notation for superspace 

The superspace consisting of Minkowski space with  supercharges is therefore labelled  or sometimes simply .

SUSY in 3 + 1 Minkowski spacetime
In  Minkowski spacetime, the Haag–Łopuszański–Sohnius theorem states that the SUSY algebra with N spinor generators is as follows.

The even part of the star Lie superalgebra is the direct sum of the Poincaré algebra and a reductive Lie algebra B (such that its self-adjoint part is the tangent space of a real compact Lie group). The odd part of the algebra would be

Both components are conjugate to each other under the * conjugation. V is an N-dimensional complex representation of B and V* is its dual representation. The Lie bracket for the odd part is given by a symmetric equivariant pairing {.,.} on the odd part with values in the even part.

N = 1

A (the intertwiner defined above) would have to be zero since it is antisymmetric.

N = 2

Now, A is a nonzero intertwiner to the  part of B.

Alternatively, V could be a 2D doublet with a nonzero  charge.  In this case, A would have to be zero.

Yet another possibility would be to let B be .

This doesn't even exhaust all the possibilities. We see that there is more than one N = 2 supersymmetry; likewise, the SUSYs for N > 2 are also not unique (in fact, it only gets worse).

N = 3

It is theoretically allowed, but the multiplet structure becomes automatically the same with
that of an N=4 supersymmetric theory. So it is less often discussed compared to N=1,2,4 version.

N = 4

This is the maximal number of supercharges in a theory without gravity.

SUSY in various dimensions
In 0 + 1, 2 + 1, 3 + 1, 4 + 1, 6 + 1, 7 + 1, 8 + 1, 10 + 1 dimensions, etc., a SUSY algebra is classified by a positive integer N.

In 1 + 1, 5 + 1, 9 + 1 dimensions, etc., a SUSY algebra is classified by two nonnegative integers (M, N), at least one of which is nonzero. M represents the number of left-handed SUSYs and N represents the number of right-handed SUSYs.

The reason of this has to do with the reality conditions of the spinors.

Hereafter d = 9 means d = 8 + 1 in Minkowski signature, etc.  The structure of supersymmetry algebra is mainly determined by the number of the fermionic generators, that is the number N times the real dimension of the spinor in d dimensions.  It is because one can obtain a supersymmetry algebra of lower dimension easily from that of higher dimensionality by the use of dimensional reduction.

d = 11
The only example is the N = 1 supersymmetry with 32 supercharges.

d = 10
From d = 11, N = 1 SUSY, one obtains N = (1, 1) nonchiral SUSY algebra, which is also called the type IIA supersymmetry. There is also N = (2, 0) SUSY algebra, which is called the type IIB supersymmetry.  Both of them have 32 supercharges.

N = (1, 0) SUSY algebra with 16 supercharges is the minimal susy algebra in 10 dimensions. It is also called the type I supersymmetry. Type IIA / IIB / I superstring theory has the SUSY algebra of the corresponding name. The supersymmetry algebra for the heterotic superstrings is that of type I.

Remarks

Notes

References 

Supersymmetry
Lie algebras